Klaus Hirche (7 June 1939 – 3 May 2022) was a German ice hockey goaltender, who competed for SG Dynamo Weißwasser. He won the bronze medal competing for East Germany at the 1966 European Championships. Hirche also played for East Germany at the 1968 Winter Olympics in Grenoble. He served on the national team's coaching staff when they finished in third place in Pool B of the 1971 World Championships.

Honours
Dynamo Weißwasser
 East German Ice Hockey Championship (12): 1957–58, 1958–59, 1959–60, 1960–61, 1961–62, 1962–63, 1963–64, 1964–65, 1968–69, 1969–70, 1970–71, 1971–72

References 

1939 births
2022 deaths
German ice hockey goaltenders
People from Weißwasser
Ice hockey players at the 1968 Winter Olympics
Lausitzer Füchse players
Olympic ice hockey players of East Germany
Sportspeople from Saxony